The 9th Golden Satellite Awards, honoring the best in film and television of 2004, were presented by the International Press Academy on January 23, 2005.

Special achievement awards
Mary Pickford Award (for outstanding contribution to the entertainment industry) – Susan Sarandon

Nikola Tesla Award (for introducing video-assist and video playback techniques, which have become industry standards) – Jerry Lewis

Outstanding New Talent – Freddie Highmore

Motion picture winners and nominees

Best Actor – Drama
 Don Cheadle – Hotel Rwanda
Kevin Bacon – The Woodsman
Javier Bardem – The Sea Inside (Mar adentro)
Gael García Bernal – The Motorcycle Diaries (Diarios de motocicleta)
Johnny Depp – Finding Neverland
Liam Neeson – Kinsey
Sean Penn – The Assassination of Richard Nixon

Best Actor – Musical or Comedy
 Jamie Foxx – Ray
Gerard Butler – The Phantom of the Opera
Jim Carrey – Eternal Sunshine of the Spotless Mind
Paul Giamatti – Sideways
Kevin Kline – De-Lovely
Bill Murray – The Life Aquatic with Steve Zissou

Best Actress – Drama
 Hilary Swank – Million Dollar Baby
Laura Linney – P.S.
Catalina Sandino Moreno – Maria Full of Grace
Imelda Staunton – Vera Drake
Uma Thurman – Kill Bill: Volume 2
Sigourney Weaver – Imaginary Heroes

Best Actress – Musical or Comedy
 Annette Bening – Being Julia
Jena Malone – Saved!
Natalie Portman – Garden State
Emmy Rossum – The Phantom of the Opera
Kerry Washington – Ray
Kate Winslet – Eternal Sunshine of the Spotless Mind

Best Animated or Mixed Media Film
 The Incredibles
The Polar Express
Shrek 2
The SpongeBob SquarePants Movie
Teacher's Pet
Team America: World Police

Best Art Direction and Production Design
 De-Lovely
The Aviator
House of Flying Daggers (Shi mian mai fu)
The Phantom of the Opera
Sky Captain and the World of Tomorrow
Vanity Fair

Best Cinematography
 House of Flying Daggers (Shi mian mai fu) – Zhao Xiaoding
The Aviator
Lemony Snicket's A Series of Unfortunate Events
The Phantom of the Opera
Spider-Man 2
A Very Long Engagement (Un long dimanche de fiançailles)

Best Costume Design
 Vanity Fair – Beatrix Aruna Pasztor
The Aviator
De-Lovely
House of Flying Daggers (Shi mian mai fu)
The Phantom of the Opera
Sky Captain and the World of Tomorrow

Best Director
 Mel Gibson – The Passion of the Christ
Bill Condon – Kinsey
Taylor Hackford – Ray
Joshua Marston – Maria Full of Grace
Alexander Payne – Sideways
Martin Scorsese – The Aviator

Best Documentary Film
 Super Size Me
Born into Brothels
The Fuente Family: An American Dream
Lightning in a Bottle
Touching the Void
Tupac: Resurrection

Best Editing
 Collateral – Jim Miller and Paul Rubell
The Aviator
Closer
House of Flying Daggers (Shi mian mai fu)
Lemony Snicket's A Series of Unfortunate Events
Spider-Man 2

Best Film – Drama
 Hotel Rwanda
The Aviator
Kill Bill: Volume 2
Kinsey
Maria Full of Grace
Vera Drake

Best Film – Musical or Comedy
 Sideways
The Life Aquatic with Steve Zissou
The Merchant of Venice
Napoleon Dynamite
The Phantom of the Opera
Ray

Best Foreign Language Film
 The Sea Inside (Mar adentro), Spain
Bad Education (La mala educación), Spain
Don't Move (Non ti muovere), Italy
House of Flying Daggers (Shi mian mai fu), China
The Motorcycle Diaries (Diarios de motocicleta), Argentina
A Very Long Engagement (Un long dimanche de fiançailles), France

Best Original Score
 "Napoleon Dynamite" – John Swihart
"Alfie" – Mick Jagger, John Powell, and David A. Stewart
"The Aviator" – Howard Shore
"Finding Neverland" – Jan A. P. Kaczmarek
"The Incredibles" – Michael Giacchino
"Spider-Man 2" – Danny Elfman

Best Original Song
 "Million Voices" written by Jerry Duplessis, Andrea Guerra, and Wyclef Jean – Hotel Rwanda
"Believe" written by Glen Ballard and Alan Silvestri – The Polar Express
"Blind Leading the Blind" written by Mick Jagger and David A. Stewart – Alfie
"The Book of Love" written by Stephin Merritt – Shall We Dance
"Learn to Be Lonely" written by Andrew Lloyd Webber – The Phantom of the Opera
"Shine Ya Light" written by Robbie Robertson – Ladder 49

Best Screenplay – Adapted
 Million Dollar Baby – Paul Haggis
Closer – Patrick Marber
The Phantom of the Opera – Joel Schumacher
Sideways – Alexander Payne and Jim Taylor

Best Screenplay – Original
 Ray – James L. White
The Aviator – John Logan
Collateral – Stuart Beattie
Hotel Rwanda – Terry George and Keir Pearson
Kinsey – Bill Condon
The Life Aquatic with Steve Zissou – Wes Anderson and Noah Baumbach

Best Sound
 Collateral
Code 46
The Aviator
The Phantom of the Opera
Spider-Man 2

Best Supporting Actor – Drama
 Christopher Walken – Around the Bend
David Carradine – Kill Bill: Volume 2
Jamie Foxx – Collateral
Alfred Molina – Spider-Man 2
Clive Owen – Closer
Peter Sarsgaard – Kinsey

Best Supporting Actor – Musical or Comedy
 Thomas Haden Church – Sideways
Joseph Fiennes – The Merchant of Venice
Jeremy Irons – Being Julia
Peter Sarsgaard – Garden State
Mark Wahlberg – I Heart Huckabees
Patrick Wilson – The Phantom of the Opera

Best Supporting Actress – Drama
 Gena Rowlands – The Notebook
Cate Blanchett – The Aviator
Daryl Hannah – Kill Bill: Volume 2
Laura Linney – Kinsey
Natalie Portman – Closer
Kyra Sedgwick – The Woodsman

Best Supporting Actress – Musical or Comedy
 Regina King – Ray
Lynn Collins – The Merchant of Venice
Minnie Driver – The Phantom of the Opera
Cloris Leachman – Spanglish
Virginia Madsen – Sideways
Sharon Warren – Ray

Best Visual Effects
 The Aviator (TIE) 
 House of Flying Daggers (Shi mian mai fu) (TIE)
Collateral
Eternal Sunshine of the Spotless Mind
Sky Captain and the World of Tomorrow
Spider-Man 2

Outstanding Motion Picture Ensemble
Sideways

Television winners and nominees

Best Actor – Drama Series
 Matthew Fox – Lost
Vincent D'Onofrio – Law & Order
Anthony LaPaglia – Without a Trace
James Spader – Boston Legal
Treat Williams – Everwood

Best Actor – Musical or Comedy Series
 Jason Bateman – Arrested Development
Zach Braff – Scrubs
Larry David – Curb Your Enthusiasm
Bernie Mac – The Bernie Mac Show
Damon Wayans – My Wife and Kids

Best Actor – Miniseries or TV Film
 Jamie Foxx – Redemption: The Stan Tookie Williams Story
Keith Carradine – Deadwood
Mos Def – Something the Lord Made
Alan Rickman – Something the Lord Made
Geoffrey Rush – The Life and Death of Peter Sellers

Best Actress – Drama Series
 Laurel Holloman – The L Word
Jennifer Garner – Alias
Evangeline Lilly – Lost
Joely Richardson – Nip/Tuck
Amber Tamblyn – Joan of Arcadia

Best Actress – Musical or Comedy Series
 Portia de Rossi – Arrested Development
Marcia Cross – Desperate Housewives
Lauren Graham – Gilmore Girls
Teri Hatcher – Desperate Housewives
Felicity Huffman – Desperate Housewives
Maya Rudolph – Saturday Night Live

Best Actress – Miniseries or TV Film
 Dianne Wiest – The Blackwater Lightship
Clea DuVall – Helter Skelter
Angela Lansbury – The Blackwater Lightship
Helen Mirren – Prime Suspect: The Last Witness
Miranda Richardson – The Lost Prince

Best Miniseries
 The Lost Prince
The 4400
American Family
The Last King
Prime Suspect: The Last Witness
The Second Coming

Best Series – Drama
 Nip/Tuck
Boston Legal
The L Word
Lost
The Shield

Best Series – Musical or Comedy
 Desperate Housewives
Arrested Development
The Bernie Mac Show
Gilmore Girls
Scrubs

Best Supporting Actor – Miniseries or TV Film
 Bill Nighy – The Lost Prince
Brad Dourif – Deadwood
Balthazar Getty – Traffic
William H. Macy – Stealing Sinatra
Keith McErlean – The Blackwater Lightship

Best Supporting Actress – Miniseries or TV Film
 Anjelica Huston – Iron Jawed Angels
Mary Stuart Masterson – Something the Lord Made
Helen McCrory – Charles II: The Power and the Passion
Gina McKee – The Lost Prince
Emily Watson – The Life and Death of Peter Sellers

Best TV Film
 Redemption: The Stan Tookie Williams Story
Helter Skelter
Iron Jawed Angels
The Life and Death of Peter Sellers
Something the Lord Made

New Media winners and nominees
For the game categories, only nominees are listed; winners are unknown:

Best Classic DVD
La Dolce Vita
The China Syndrome
Easy Rider
Fanny and Alexander
Murder on the Orient Express
Persuasion, Little Women, and Sense and Sensibility (for the Classic Masterpiece Book & DVD set)
Ragtime
The Snake Pit
Star Wars, The Empire Strikes Back, and Return of the Jedi (for the Star Wars Trilogy)
Time Bandits (for the Divimax Special Edition)
Zorba the Greek

Best Documentary DVD
Broadway: The American Musical
Ancient Mysteries and Rise and Fall of the Spartans (for the "Troy – Unearthing the Legend" DVD)
Brooklyn Bridge, The Statue of Liberty, Huey Long, The Congress, Thomas Hart Benton, Empire of the Air: The Men Who Made Radio, and The Shakers: Hands to Work, Hearts to God (for the Ken Burns' America Collection)
Capturing the Friedmans
Fahrenheit 9/11
In the Footsteps of Alexander the Great
It's All True
Seven Up!, 7 Plus Seven, 21 Up, 28 Up, 35 Up, and 42 Up (for the "Up" film series)
Spellbound
Super Size Me

Best DVD Extras
Maria Full of Grace (for the documentary)
Angel (for Season 4; for the commentary)
Buffy the Vampire Slayer (for Season 6; for the commentary)
Easy Rider (for the documentary)
Ed Wood (for the commentary)
La Dolce Vita (for the commentary)

Best DVD Release of TV Shows
Seinfeld
24 (for Season 3)
Alias (for Season 3)
Angel (for Season 4)
Buffy the Vampire Slayer (for Season 6)
Felicity (for Edition III)
Frasier (for The Final Season)
Sex and the City (for Season 6)
Taxi (for The Complete First Season)
Terrahawks

Outstanding Game Based on a Previous Medium
The Chronicles of Riddick: Escape from Butcher Bay
GoldenEye: Rogue Agent
Harry Potter and the Prisoner of Azkaban
The Incredibles
Rocky Legends
Star Wars Knights of the Old Republic II: The Sith Lords
X-Men Legends

Outstanding Overall DVD
Spider-Man 2
Angel (for Season 4)
Broadway: The American Musical
Buffy the Vampire Slayer (for Season 6)
Dawn of the Dead (for the Ultimate Edition)
Easy Rider
La Dolce Vita
The Lord of the Rings: The Return of the King
The Matrix, The Matrix Reloaded, The Matrix Revolutions, and The Animatrix (for The Ultimate Matrix Collection)
Pirates of the Caribbean: The Curse of the Black Pearl (for the 3-Disc Gift Set)
Star Wars, The Empire Strikes Back, and Return of the Jedi (for the Star Wars Trilogy)

Outstanding Platform Action/Adventure Game
Call of Duty: Finest Hour
Doom 3
Grand Theft Auto: San Andreas
Halo 2
Metroid Prime 2: Echoes
Mortal Kombat: Deception

Outstanding Puzzle/Strategy Game
The Guy Game
Katamari Damacy
Sid Meier's Pirates!
Ultra Bust-A-Move X
The Urbz: Sims in the City
Worms 3D

Outstanding Sports Game
ESPN NFL 2K5
Major League Baseball 2005
MX Unleashed
NBA Ballers
NFL Street
Tony Hawk's Underground 2

Outstanding Youth DVD
The Iron Giant
Aladdin (for the Special Platinum Edition)
The Big Snooze, Beep, Beep, Bad Ol' Putty Tat, and Back Alley Oproar (for Looney Tunes: Golden Collection – Volume 2)
Elf
Ella Enchanted
Meet Me in St. Louis
Mulan (for the Special Edition)
Rocky and His Friends (for The Complete Second Season)
Seven Brides for Seven Brothers (for the Warner Bros. Edition)
SpongeBob SquarePants (for The Complete Second Season)
Terrahawks

Awards breakdown

Film
Winners:
3 / 4 Hotel Rwanda: Best Actor & Film – Drama / Best Original Song
3 / 7 Ray: Best Actor – Musical or Comedy / Best Supporting Actress – Musical or Comedy / Best Screenplay – Original
3 / 7 Sideways: Best Film – Musical or Comedy / Best Supporting Actor – Musical or Comedy / Outstanding Motion Picture Ensemble
2 / 2 Million Dollar Baby: Best Actress – Drama / Best Screenplay – Adapted
2 / 5 Collateral: Best Editing / Best Sound
2 / 6 House of Flying Daggers (Shi mian mai fu): Best Cinematography / Best Visual Effects
1 / 1 Around the Bend: Best Supporting Actor – Drama
1 / 1 The Notebook: Best Supporting Actress – Drama
1 / 1 The Passion of the Christ: Best Director
1 / 1 Super Size Me: Best Documentary Film
1 / 2 Being Julia: Best Actress – Musical or Comedy
1 / 2 The Incredibles: Best Animated or Mixed Media Film
1 / 2 Napoleon Dynamite: Best Original Score
1 / 2 The Sea Inside (Mar adentro): Best Foreign Language Film
1 / 2 Vanity Fair: Best Costume Design
1 / 3 De-Lovely: Best Art Direction and Production Design
1 / 11 The Aviator: Best Visual Effects

Losers:
0 / 11 The Phantom of the Opera
0 / 6 Kinsey, Spider-Man 2
0 / 4 Closer, Kill Bill: Volume 2
0 / 3 Eternal Sunshine of the Spotless Mind, The Life Aquatic with Steve Zissou, Maria Full of Grace, The Merchant of Venice, Sky Captain and the World of Tomorrow
0 / 2 Alfie, Finding Neverland, Garden State, Lemony Snicket's A Series of Unfortunate Events, The Motorcycle Diaries (Diarios de motocicleta), The Polar Express, Vera Drake, A Very Long Engagement (Un long dimanche de fiançailles), The Woodsman

Television
Winners:
2 / 2 Redemption: The Stan Tookie Williams Story: Best Actor – Miniseries or TV Film / Best TV Film
2 / 3 Arrested Development: Best Actor & Actress – Musical or Comedy Series
2 / 4 The Lost Prince: Best Miniseries / Best Supporting Actor – Miniseries or TV Film
1 / 2 Iron Jawed Angels: Best Supporting Actress – Miniseries or TV Film
1 / 2 The L Word: Best Actress – Drama Series
1 / 2 Nip/Tuck: Best Series – Drama
1 / 3 The Blackwater Lightship: Best Actress – Miniseries or TV Film
1 / 3 Lost: Best Actor – Drama Series
1 / 4 Desperate Housewives: Best Series – Musical or Comedy Series

Losers:
0 / 4 Something the Lord Made
0 / 3 The Life and Death of Peter Sellers
0 / 2 The Bernie Mac Show, Boston Legal, Deadwood, Gilmore Girls, Helter Skelter, Prime Suspect: The Last Witness, Scrubs

References

Satellite Awards ceremonies
2004 awards
2004 film awards
2004 television awards